Heping may refer to:

 Heping, Taichung (和平區), a district in Taichung, Taiwan

Places in Mainland China
 Heping District, Tianjin (和平区)
 Heping District, Shenyang (和平区), Liaoning
 Heping County (和平县), of Heyuan, Guangdong

Subdistricts
 Heping Subdistrict, Shaoguan, in Zhenjiang District, Shaoguan, Guangdong
 Heping Subdistrict, Gaobeidian, Hebei
 Heping Subdistrict, Handan, in Congtai District, Handan, Hebei
 Heping Subdistrict, Wuhan, in Hongshan District, Wuhan, Hubei
 Heping Subdistrict, Baotou, in Donghe District, Baotou, Inner Mongolia
 Heping Subdistrict, Ulan Hot, Inner Mongolia
 Heping Subdistrict, Xuzhou, in Quanshan District, Xuzhou, Jiangsu
 Heping Subdistrict, Meihekou, Jilin
 Heping Subdistrict, Anshan City, in Tiedong District, Anshan, Liaoning
 Heping Subdistrict, Fushun, in Wanghua District, Fushun, Liaoning
 Heping Subdistrict, Fuxin, in Haizhou District, Fuxin, Liaoning
 Heping Subdistrict, Zibo, in Zhangdian District, Zibo, Shandong
 Heping Subdistrict, Taiyuan, in Wanbailin District, Taiyuan, Shanxi
 Heping Subdistrict, Tacheng, Xinjiang
 Heping Subdistrict, Xiangtan, a subdistrict of Yuhu District, Xiangtan City, Hunan

Towns
 Heping, Shaowu, Fujian
 Heping, Zhangping, Fujian
 Heping, Wuwei, in Liangzhou District, Wuwei, Gansu
 Heping, Yuzhong County, Gansu
 Heping, Shantou, in Chaoyang District, Shantou, Guangdong
 Heping, Teng County, Guangxi
 Heping, Huishui County, Guizhou
 Heping, Yanhe County, in Yanhe Tujia Autonomous County, Guizhou
 Heping, Qiongzhong County, in Qiongzhong Li and Miao Autonomous County, Hainan
 Heping, Tailai County, Heilongjiang
 Heping, Wudalianchi, Heilongjiang
 Heping, Guiyang County, Hunan
 Heping, Huai'an, in Qingpu District, Huai'an, Jiangsu
 Heping, Fenxi County, Shanxi
 Heping, Changxing County, Zhejiang

Townships
 Heping Township, Yuexi County, Anhui
 Heping Township, Longxi County, Gansu
 Heping Township, Longsheng County, in Longsheng Various Nationalities Autonomous County, Guangxi
 Heping Township, Sanjiang County, in Sanjiang Dong Autonomous County, Guangxi
 Heping Township, Tongren City, Guizhou
 Heping Township, Zhaoyuan County, Heilongjiang
 Heping Township, Hengyang, in Zhuhui District, Hengyang, Hunan
 Heping Township, Faku County, Liaoning
 Heping Township, Huangyuan County, Qinghai
 Heping Township, Anyue County, Sichuan
 Heping Township, Nanjiang County, Sichuan
 Heping Township, Xinlong County, Sichuan
 Heping Township, Zigong, in Da'an District, Zigong, Sichuan
 Heping Township, Yunxiao County, Zhejiang

Historical eras
Heping (河平, 28BC–25BC), era name used by Emperor Cheng of Han
Heping (和平, 150), era name used by Emperor Huan of Han
Heping (和平, 354–355), era name used by Zhang Zuo, ruler of Former Liang
Heping (和平, 460–465), era name used by Emperor Wencheng of Northern Wei

See also
He Ping (disambiguation)
Hoa Binh (disambiguation), the Vietnamese cognate
Hwapyong County, from the Korean cognate

vi:Hòa Bình (định hướng)